Pan Jianwei (born 11 March 1970) is a Chinese quantum physicist, university administrator and professor of physics at the University of Science and Technology of China. Pan is known for his work in the field of quantum entanglement, quantum information and quantum computers. In 2017, he was named one of Nature's 10, which labelled him "Father of Quantum". He is an academician of the Chinese Academy of Sciences and the World Academy of Sciences and Executive Vice President of the University of Science and Technology of China. He also serves as one of the Vice Chairman of Jiusan Society.

Early life and education
Pan was born in Dongyang, Jinhua, Zhejiang province in 1970. In 1987, he entered the University of Science and Technology of China (USTC), from which he received his bachelor's and master's degrees. He received his PhD from the University of Vienna in Austria, where he studied and worked in the group led by Nobel prize winning physicist Anton Zeilinger.

Contributions
Pan's team demonstrated five-photon entanglement in 2004. Under his leadership, the world's first quantum satellite launched successfully in August 2016 as part of the Quantum Experiments at Space Scale, a Chinese research project. In June 2017, Pan's team used their quantum satellite to demonstrate entanglement with satellite-to-ground total summed lengths between 1600km and 2400km and entanglement distribution over 1200km between receiver stations.

In 2021, Pan led a team which built quantum computers. One of the devices, named "Zuchongzhi 2.1", was claimed to be one million times faster than its nearest competitor, Google's Sycamore.

Awards and recognition
Pan was elected to the Chinese Academy of Sciences in 2011 at the age of 41, making him one of the youngest CAS academicians. He was then elected to the World Academy of Sciences in 2012 and won the International Quantum Communication Award in the same year.

In April 2014, he was appointed Vice President of the University of Science and Technology of China.

His team's work on double quantum-teleportation was selected as the Physics World "Top Breakthrough of the Year" in 2015. His team, whose members include Peng Chengzhi, Chen Yu'ao, Lu Chaoyang, and Chen Zengbing, won the State Natural Science Award (First Class) in 2015.

In 2017, the journal Nature named Pan, along with such figures as Ann Olivarius and Scott Pruitt, one of the top 10 people who made "a significant impact in science either for good or for bad", with the label "Father of Quantum" given to Pan.

Pan was included in Time magazine's 100 Most Influential People of 2018.

In 2019, Pan was appointed as lead editor of Physical Review Research.

In 2020, Pan received the ZEISS Research Award.

References

1970 births
Living people
Quantum physicists
Chinese academic administrators
Members of the Chinese Academy of Sciences
Members of the Jiusan Society
Physicists from Zhejiang
Scientists from Jinhua
Educators from Jinhua
People from Dongyang
TWAS fellows
University of Science and Technology of China alumni
Academic staff of the University of Science and Technology of China
University of Vienna alumni